Cristina Marocco (born 21 March 1972 in Turin, Italy) is an Italian singer and actress.

Biography
Cristina Marocco's father had Sicilian origin; some believe that one of his grandparents came from Morocco; for this reason he was called "Marocco", which means "Morocco" in the Italian language.

Cristina Marocco became famous as an actress in her home country. She met Marc Lavoine and recorded with him the song "J'ai tout oublié", which became a huge hit in France and 2001. Marocco worked then on her first album, and her first single from this album, "Appelle-moi", was released in May 2003. Her album À côté du soleil was released a few months later. On this album, Lara Fabian wrote the song "Faire semblant". In 2008, she came out with her latest album, Je te dirais que tout est beau. The video clip Le Parfum, appeals the French public. This video was shot in one of the most paris prestigious hotel, the champs elysees plaza hotel.

Discography

Albums
 2003 : À côté du soleil
 2008 : Je te dirais que tout est beau

Singles
 2001 : "J'ai tout oublié" (duet with Marc Lavoine) – No. 1 in France, No. 4 in Belgium
 2002 : "On s'en va" – No. 84 in France
 2003 : "Appelle-moi"
 2003 : "Tout donner"
 2008 : "Le Parfum"

References

External links

1972 births
Living people
Italian actresses
Italian pop singers
French-language singers of Italy
21st-century Italian singers
21st-century Italian women singers